Joel Eipe (born 12 March 1997) is a Danish badminton player. He won the boys' doubles title at the 2015 European Junior Championships, and a silver medal at the World Junior Championships.

Career 
Eipe has planned to compete at the 2021 European Championships in Kyiv, Ukraine, but he failed to made his debut in the championships after tested positive of COVID-19.

Achievements

BWF World Junior Championships 
Boys' doubles

European Junior Championships 
Boys' doubles

BWF International Challenge/Series (4 titles, 3 runners-up) 
Men's doubles

Mixed doubles

  BWF International Challenge tournament
  BWF International Series tournament
  BWF Future Series tournament

References

External links 
 

1997 births
Living people
Sportspeople from Frederiksberg
Danish male badminton players